Joseph W. Dorsey may refer to:
 Joseph Dorsey (politician), American politician from Pennsylvania
 Joseph Dorsey (baseball), American baseball pitcher and outfielder